Kawasaki line may refer to:

 Kawasaki Kisen Kaisha aka K-Line, a private Japanese railroad line and operating company
 Kawasaki Municipal Subway, a future subway line in Kawasaki, Kanagwa Prefecture, Japan
 Kawasaki City Tram, a former tram line in Kawasaki, Kanagwa Prefecture, Japan

See also
Kawasaki Route aka Route K6, a toll road of the Shuto expressway system in Greater Tokyo